Swati Avasthi is an Indian-American writer of fiction and a professor. 
Her first young adult novel, Split, receiving several awards including Cybils Young Adult Fiction Award and a Parents’ Choice 2010 Silver Award. 
In 2009, her short story "Swallow" was nominated for the Pushcart Prize and was listed in 2009 Best American New Voices collection. 
Chasing Shadows is her second novel, published in 2013, and was listed as "Best of 2013" book by Kirkus, YALSA, and Bank Street.

She has taught for Hamline University, at the Anoka-Ramsey Community College, and at the Loft Literary Center in the Bachelor of Fine Arts (BFA) and Master of Fine Arts (MFA) programs.

Biography
Avasthi moved from India to Albuquerque, where she studied till the age of 18 and her desire was to become a fiction writer. She went to the University of Chicago for a bachelors  in humanities with an emphasis on theater. Before studying law, she started working at Victory Gardens Theater for a year. For three years she worked for the Pro Bono Advocates in Cook County in the role of a paralegal and coordinator in the domestic violence clinic. She provided legal assistance in the civil court to abuse victims seeking emergency orders.

She was married to John Yopp and the pair moved to Minnesota in 1997 to attend law school. Shortly after, Avasthi gave birth to her first child, and took a leave of absence from law school to raise him. 
However, in 2000 she left law studies and began writing before the birth of her second child in 2001.  She developed her writing skills at the Loft Literary Center in Minneapolis. She received the in the Loft Mentor Series Award, where she was mentored by Pete Hautman, a young adult author, and Shay Youngblood, a writer of  novels and plays. From 2007-2010, she pursued studies for an MFA at the University of Minnesota. Here she received a fellowship from the University to complete her debut novel Split, which she finished by 2008. It was put to auction and the first bidder, Knopf, published it in 2010. Her second novel is Chasing Shadows, which was also published in 2013 by Knopf. In 2011 she began teaching at Hamline University and later at Minnesota University.

Awards
As a young adult fiction writer she received the following awards and nominations.
Young Adult Services Division, 
 School Library Journal Author 
Nomination for Bank Street Child Study Children’s Book Award
Nomination for IRA Children’s Book Award for Younger Readers 
Nomination for Kentucky Bluegrass Award 
Nomination for Louisiana Young Reader’s Choice  
Nomination for Maryland Black-Eyed Susan Award 
Nomination for Oklahoma Sequoyah Children’s Book Award 
Nomination for Rhode Island Teen Book Award

Works

References

Living people
Novelists from Minnesota
American young adult novelists
21st-century American novelists
American novelists of Indian descent
American women novelists
American women writers of Indian descent
Indian emigrants to the United States
University of Chicago alumni
University of Minnesota alumni
Hamline University faculty
Women writers of young adult literature
1970s births
21st-century American women writers
American women academics